Revolutionary Vol. 2 is the second studio album by rapper Immortal Technique, It was released on November 18, 2003, and is a follow-up to his debut album, Revolutionary Vol. 1. Both albums were re-pressed in 2004 by Babygrande Records.

Revolutionary Vol. 2 attacks the United States government, especially the Bush Administration. Immortal Technique claimed in an interview to have sold more than 85,000 copies. The album features Mumia Abu-Jamal, who introduces the album and also provides a speech about hip hop's relationship to homeland security. Issues repeatedly discussed on the album include poverty, drug trade, slave labor, censorship, corporate control over the media (including hip hop), the September 11th World Trade Center attacks, racism, the prison industrial complex and class struggle.

Track listing

References

External links
 Viper Records official website
 

Nature Sounds albums
Immortal Technique albums
2003 albums
Albums produced by Domingo (producer)
Sequel albums